Paradise and Lunch is the fourth album by roots rock musician Ry Cooder, released on June 8, 1974 on Reprise Records. The album is composed of cover versions of jazz, blues and roots standards and obscurities recorded at the Warner Brothers Studios. The final track, "Ditty Wah Ditty," showcases a duet between Cooder and jazz pianist Earl "Fatha" Hines. It was produced by Russ Titelman and Lenny Waronker. The album reached #167 on the Billboard 200.

The album also includes Cooder's updated arrangement of bluesman Washington Phillips' "The Tattler" that stands out for its guitar playing. It was subsequently covered by Linda Ronstadt on her 1976 album Hasten Down the Wind and by David Soul on his 1977 album Playing To An Audience of One.

In 1990 the album was released on CD, while a remastered version appeared in 2007. It was newly remastered from the original master tapes for a high-resolution SACD in 2017.

Track listing

Side One
"Tamp 'Em Up Solid" (Traditional) – 3:19
"Tattler" (Washington Phillips, Ry Cooder, Russ Titelman) – 4:14
"Married Man's a Fool" (Blind Willie McTell) – 3:10
"Jesus on the Mainline" (Traditional) – 4:09
"It's All Over Now" (Bobby Womack, Shirley Womack) – 4:49

Side Two
"Fool for a Cigarette/Feelin' Good" (Sidney Bailey, J. B. Lenoir, Jim Dickinson) (medley) – 4:25
"If Walls Could Talk" (Bobby Miller) – 3:12
"Mexican Divorce" (Burt Bacharach, Bob Hilliard) – 3:51
"Ditty Wah Ditty" (Arthur Blake) – 5:42

Personnel
Ry Cooder - guitars, mandolin, vocals
Milt Holland – drums, percussion
Jim Keltner – drums
Russ Titelman, Chris Ethridge – electric bass
Ronnie Barron – piano, organ
Red Callender, John Duke – bass
Plas Johnson – alto saxophone
Oscar Brashear – cornet
Bobby King, Gene Mumford, Bill Johnson, George McCurn, Walter Cook, Richard Jones, Russ Titelman, Karl Russell – voices
Earl Hines - piano on "Ditty Wah Ditty"
George Bohanon - horn arrangement
Nick DeCaro - string arrangement
Technical
Russ Titelman, Lenny Waronker - production
Judy Maizel, Trudy Portch - production coordination
Lee Herschberg - engineer, mixing
Bobby Hata, John Neal - assistant engineer
Susan Titelman (Ry Cooder's wife and Russ Titelman's sister) – cover paintings and photography

Chart positions

References

1974 albums
Ry Cooder albums
Albums produced by Lenny Waronker
Albums produced by Russ Titelman
Reprise Records albums
Covers albums